Derriaghy Cricket Club is a cricket club in Derriaghy, County Antrim, Northern Ireland, playing in Section 1 of the NCU Senior League. They have 3 senior teams and junior teams from U11 to U17. The 1st XI are the current League Section 1 Champions, The 3rd XI are the current Junior League 6 Champions. The U11, U13 and U15 teams are all current League Champions.

References

External links
Derriaghy Cricket Club

Cricket clubs in County Antrim
NCU Senior League members
Cricket clubs in Northern Ireland